The 10th Annual Shorty Awards powered by DirecTV Now, honoring the best in social media, took place on April 15, 2018, at the PlayStation Theater, New York City. The ceremony was hosted by actress, singer, songwriter, Keke Palmer.

Influencer winners and nominees 
Nominations were announced on January 16, 2018, with public voting closing on February 22, 2018. Finalists were announced on March 20, 2018. Winners were announced at the ceremony on April 15, 2018. Winners are listed first and in boldface.

Arts & Entertainment

Content of the Year

Creative & Media

Team Internet

Tech & Innovation

References 
 10th Annual Shorty Awards Winners

 10th Annual Shorty Awards Finalists

Shorty Awards
2018 in Internet culture